Luke Doolan is an Australian film editor and director. He was nominated for an Academy Award for Best Live Action Short Film and he is the winner of three Australian Film Institute Awards.

Collaboration
Doolan is part of a network of young Australian filmmakers who collaborate on projects, called Blue-Tongue Films. Others in the group include Nash and Joel Edgerton, David Michôd, Kieran Darcy-Smith .

Movies
In 2010, Doolan was nominated for an Academy Award as a best live-action short for his 17-minute film Miracle Fish. It was made with a producer Drew Bailey. Doolan filmed Miracle Fish at his 10-year-old sister's school, Annandale North Public School. Some scenes were shot at Matraville Sports High.

Film credits

References

Australian film directors
Living people
Year of birth missing (living people)